The 1998 UCI Cyclo-cross World Championships were held in Middelfart, Denmark on Saturday 31 January 1998. The course was dry, hard and technical. Weather conditions were sunny, but freezing (-2°C).

Medal table

Medal summary

Men's Elite

Held on Sunday January 31, 1998. Being the main event of the day, over 10,000 people had come to watch nine laps (27.675 kilometres) of cyclo-cross. Mario De Clercq got an early lead and managed to widen it lap by lap. Meanwhile in the background his fellow countryman Erwin Vervecken was controlling the chasing group with ease, sacrificing personal gain for the nation. Parrying every attack, Vervecken managed to play out his own cards in the final climb and raced to a silver medal. Henrik Djernis took the bronze with Daniele Pontoni crashing while trying to pass the Dane in the last line.

Men's Under 23

Held on Sunday January 31, 1998. The gathered crowd of 5,000 saw a repeat of the year before with Sven Nys and Bart Wellens claiming gold and silver. Petr Dlask completed the podium. The riders had to complete seven laps, totalling up to 22.5 kilometres.

Men's Junior

Held on January 31, 1998.

Notes

External links
 UCI Website

UCI Cyclo-cross World Championships
World Championships
Cyclo-cross
International cycle races hosted by Denmark
UCI Cyclo-cross World Championships